The Encina Power Station (EPS) was a large natural gas and oil-fueled electricity generating plant located in Carlsbad, California, in San Diego County.  Constructed in 1954, it was one of the major suppliers of electricity for the region.  On December 11, 2018, the plant was put into "retired" status and officially stopped operations.  Under an agreement approved by NRG Energy, SDG&E and the City of Carlsbad in January 2014, NRG must tear down the old plant within three years of its retirement. The plant is owned by NRG Energy.

Location
EPS sits on the southern shore of the outer segment of the Agua Hedionda Lagoon; once a stinking pool at low tide, it was opened to a continuous tidal flow to create a cooling system that was constructed along with the plant.  Now home to blue herons, ibises, and a multitude of aquatic life, the lagoon is attached to the ocean and other waterways through rising tide levels and various small creeks.  The lagoon served as EPS' source for its once-through cooling and is also owned by NRG Energy.

In 2015, Connecticut-based Poseidon Resources Corp. constructed a US$300 million water-desalination plant at the site, adjacent to the power plant.  The facility was designed to produce  of drinking water per day, enough to supply about 100,000 homes.

Retirement
NRG had announced plans to expand the Encina Power Station with the construction of a new 588-megawatt plant on a plot of land adjacent to the current site.  This has been met with considerable political opposition by local homeowners and environmentalists.  The City of Carlsbad issued an injunction against the construction of a new plant, but as of the summer of 2010 plans for the new plant were still moving forward.

The closing of San Onofre Nuclear Generating Station (SONGS) about 30 miles north  led to city officials approving the new state-of-the-art power plant in January 2014. As of May 2014, a gas-fired facility will sit adjacent to the Encina Power Station and eventually replace the 400-ft smokestack. In May 2015, plans to modify the plant to a natural gas facility were approved by the Public Utilities Commission; construction is planned to begin in 2016. On December 11, 2018, the plant ceased power generating operations and has been demolished . It was replaced by a 530 megawatt peaker plant known as the Carlsbad Energy Center.

References

Energy infrastructure completed in 1954
Buildings and structures in San Diego County, California
Natural gas-fired power stations in California
Oil-fired power stations in California
Carlsbad, California
NRG Energy